James Albert "Dan" Boone (January 19, 1895 – June 11, 1968) was an American professional baseball pitcher. He played in Major League Baseball (MLB) from 1919 to 1923 for the Philadelphia Athletics, Detroit Tigers, and Cleveland Indians. His younger brother, Ike, also played in the major leagues from 1922 to 1932.

Boone reached the majors in 1919 with the Philadelphia Athletics, spending one year with them before moving to the Detroit Tigers (1921) and Cleveland Indians (1922–1923).In a four-season career, he posted an 8–13 record with 25 strikeouts and a 5.10 earned run average in 162 innings pitched, including four complete games and two shutouts.

Boone died in Tuscaloosa, Alabama, at the age of 73.

External links

Major League Baseball pitchers
Philadelphia Athletics players
Detroit Tigers players
Cleveland Indians players
Minor league baseball managers
Alabama Crimson Tide baseball players
Baseball players from Alabama
Bradenton Explorers players
People from Tuscaloosa County, Alabama
1895 births
1968 deaths
Alabama Crimson Tide football players
American football ends
All-Southern college football players